HMS Ceres was an 18-gun sloop launched in 1777 for the British Royal Navy that the French captured in December 1778 off Saint Lucia. The French Navy took her into service as Cérès. The British recaptured her in 1782 and renamed her HMS Raven, only to have the French recapture her again early in 1783. The French returned her name to Cérès, and she then served in the French Navy until sold at Brest in 1791.

HMS Ceres
Ceres was the only ship-sloop of her design.

Commander Samuel Warren commissioned Ceres in March 1777. In September, Commander James Dacres replaced Warren. Dacres sailed to the West Indies, arriving in December.

When the American ships attempted to flee, Alfred fell behind her faster consort. Shortly after noon the British men-of-war caught up with Alfred and forced her to surrender after a half an hour's battle. Her captors described Alfred as being of 300 tons and 180 men, and under the command of Elisha Hinsman.

On 18 October 1778, Ceres captured the French privateer Tigre.

A little over a month later, on 17 December 1778, the French captured Ceres off St Lucia. After a chase of 48 hours, Dacres was forced to strike to Iphigénie as Sagittaire was only  astern and closing.

The British fleet under Admiral Barrington that had captured St Lucia, captured the American privateer  on 22 December 1778. Barrington decided to take her into service as HMS Surprize as she was a fast sailer and he had just been informed that the French had captured Ceres. Barrington  also arranged an exchange of prisoners with the French, the crew of Bunker Hill for the crew of Ceres. Dacres subsequently returned to England.

Cérès
The French Navy coppered Cérès after they captured her. She came to be known as Petite Cérès to distinguish her from the French 32-gun frigate  launched in 1779 (and broken up in 1797).

In 1779 Cérès was under the Marquis de Traversay. Under his command she seized numerous British transports. In October, Ceres participated in the attempt by French and Continental Army to retake Savannah. Despite the assistance of a French naval squadron commanded by Comte d'Estaing, the effort was a spectacular failure,

In 1780 Cérès was part of the fleet under Admiral the comte de Guichen. She participated in the battle of Martinique on 17 April, and in two subsequent fleet engagements on 15 and 19 May.

In September, Cérès arrived at Cadiz as a member of a squadron under Guichen that escorted 95 merchant vessels back from the West Indies. On 7 November, Admiral the Comte d'Estaing sortied from Cadiz with the Franco-Spanish fleet there. Cérès, under the command of Traversay, was in the Van Division. The fleet soon returned to port, not having accomplished anything.

In the wake of the battle of the Saintes (took place 9–12 April 1782), Admiral Rodney detached , under the command of Captain Alexander Hood. Champion, became part of a squadron under Alexander Hood's brother, Sir Samuel Hood.

Cérès, under the command of Baron de Peroy, departed Guadeloupe on 15 April 1782. On 19 April the British squadron sighted five small French warships and gave chase to them, capturing four, including Cérès. (Peroy became friends with his captor, Alexander Hood. After the war Hood visited Peroy in France.)

Because the Royal Navy had a new , a 32-gun fifth rate launched in 1781, the Royal Navy renamed their capture HMS Raven.

HMS Raven
Between June and September 1782, Raven was at Plymouth, undergoing fitting. This included coppering.

In July 1782, Commander William Domett commissioned Raven. On 9 September Commander John Wells replaced Domett. At some point Wells sailed Raven to the West Indies.

Raven sailed to investigate, but the strange vessel turned out to be a British merchantman, as did another. By this time Raven was well out of sight of Hercules.

That evening and the next day there was no wind. At about 10a.m. on the morning of 7 January, Raven sighted two frigates sailing towards her from the direction of Guadeloupe. Raven initially sailed towards them until she realized that they were not British. They were in fact the French frigates  and Concorde.

An all-day chase ensued until about 9 p.m. when one of the frigates got within pistol-shot and fired a broadside that shot away Ravens main topgallant-mast. The chase continued until about 10:30 p.m. when one of the frigates was again in range, with the other coming up rapidly. At this point Raven, which was under the command of Commander John Wells, struck. The French Navy took Raven into service under the name Cérès. Wells and his crew remained prisoners of war until the end of the war a few months later.

Cérès
The French Navy returned Raven to her earlier name, Cérès.

Fate
The French Navy sold Cérès at Brest in 1791.

Citations and references
Citations

References
 
 
 
 
 
 

1777 ships
Sloops of the Royal Navy
Captured ships
Corvettes of the French Navy